Amirhossein Karimi is an Iranian international  center midfielder who has played in different national team levels for his country.

Born in Tehran, he is a creative midfielder with strong left and right foot. He has regularly represented Iran at U-17, U-20    and U-23   level respectively.

Amirhossein Karimi biggest achievement to date was partaking in the FIFA U-17 World Cup in 2013. Playing a pivotal role in qualification from the group matches and going on to score one of the goals of the tournament with a spectacular 30-yard strike in the 1-1 draw against Canada in the final group stages.

In 2013, Zlatko Kranjčar was impressed by the Amirhossein Karimi performance in U-17, U-20 national team and U-23 Sepahan team and recommended Sepahan to sign a 3 years contract with him. He made his debut for Sepahan on 5 December 2013 against Esteghlal. He also played 6 games in the AFC Champions League for Sepahan.

For 2015–16 Iran Pro League, Amirhossein Karimi joined Gostaresh Foulad F.C. club based on Faraz Kamalvand (Gostaresh Foolad head coach) request. He had a great year in this club and even Igor Štimac (Sepahan head coach at the time) regretted that they did not have Amirhossein Karimi with them in that season.

Club career statistics

Honours

Club
Sepahan
Iran Pro League (1): 2014–15

References

Sepahan S.C. footballers
1996 births
Living people
Iranian footballers
Sportspeople from Isfahan
Association football midfielders
Gostaresh Foulad F.C. players